Telangana Social Welfare Residential Educational Institutions Society is an educational institution, which organizes about 1,000 Social Welfare Residential Schools in Telangana state by the Government of Telangana, India.

History
Telangana Social Welfare Residential Education Institution Society TSWREIS residential schools and colleges which are started by THE SRI.N.T.RAMARAO former Chief Minister of united Andhrapradesh Government in 1984 to provide quality education to poor Scheduled Caste, Scheduled Tribe, and Other Backward Caste students by establishing residential schools. At present there are 267 institutions with residential schools, junior and degree colleges with good infrastructure and focus on the all round development of students so that they can face the world with confidence. At present under the state bifurcation policy Andhra Pradesh Social welfare residential Educational Institutions Society has been divided into two separate institutions each in Telangana and Andhra Pradesh respectively. Dr. Repalle Shiva Praveen Kumar IPS is the Secretary of the Telangana Social Welfare Residential Institutions Society.

Background
India has undergone many social movements like civil rights, labour/trade movements, women's movement, human rights movement, dalit and tribal movements from last few centuries. Many of them are against the vulnerable social practices which are untouchability, discrimination based on caste, atrocities against the certain sections of dalit, tribal, backward and minority communities. One such community who has always been on the receiving end and have never got the opportunity to live a life of dignity is Dalit.
Pre-Independent India has seen great leaders like Mahatma Jyotirao Phule and Dr. B. R. Ambedkar who have given their life for empowerment and equality of Dalit community. Post independence, India has brought in various reforms and welfare programs but many of those are either in paper or at Idea stage.

Contribution of SR Sankaran
One such leader who has brought a revolution and took drastic steps in formulating Pro-poor policies as a bureaucrat is S. R. Sankaran. Though he is born in an upper-class family but his exceptional work especially towards the Dalit and other marginalized community has been appreciated by all over India. He always believed injustice and stigma attached with Dalit can be removed by empowering them with education and creating employment opportunity. During his tenure as Secretary in Social Welfare Department he has brought in various reforms like protection of Dalits and Adivasis under the Prevention of Atrocities Act, improvement and expansion of reservation, poverty alleviation by assigning, distributing and creating employment opportunity for landless, integrated development under various government schemes, releasing bonded labour, conversion to other religion, women issues. In education sector he has brought in major reforms like setting up exclusive schools for Dalits, providing scholarships, developing hostels, colleges. All the untiring, sincere and dedicated work for the downtrodden has got him many awards and recognition but he will always be remembered as "People’s IAS Officer".

Alumni

SWAEROES movement
Dr.R.S.Praveen Kumar IPS(VRS)BSP, the secretary of social welfare schools, is the founder and the guiding force to launch a payback movement called SWAEROES. Where SWAEROES stands for Social Welfare Aeroes (Greek for sky) it means that sky is the limit and there is no reverse gear or no looking back or no slowing down.

Why SWAEROES Our great leaders Jyotirao Phule and Dr. BR Ambedkar have always tried to create new leaders so that their ideology and fight against injustice can be taken forward but because of lack of education and empowerment they have always been on the back-foot. Now institution like TSWREIS has created an opportunity for the upliftment of children of marginalised community in the areas of education, research and employment, which has led to create a platform for future leaders so that they can go back and serve their respective communities. Majority of the students are first generation learners, in spite of education family members are apprehensive about the opportunities.

How they will redefine the dignity of Swaeroes : Since the establishment of institution in 1984, they have produced thousands of brilliant students. Many of the students have gone ahead created a mark for themselves in their carrier and for the community. All the student who have studied in this institution have come together and have formed an organization called SWAEROES. The strong army of ----members have a strong network with members from different professional background. They will be playing the role of a guide and mentor for all the SWAEROES.

Programs and events
The following are some of the programs through which they are going to impact the community:

BHEEM DHEEKSHA:  It is life changing dheeksha starts on 15 March to 14 April every year we are remembering our great forefathers birth anniversaries by the time of Bheem dheeksha month. Reading life history of our fathers Dr Ambedkar, Phule, Savitri bhai, kansiram.

We should wake up early in the morning 5 am. We should do exercise daily. We should not take alcohol.

Parents Fest  All the students in the school belong to a very humble background and majority of them are the first time learners, parents are not aware of the talent and the kind of learning happening in school. So, the Parents Fest is conducted to showcase the talent of their children. Apart from the students, alumni group also participate and share their stories to boost the confidence and give a hope to the parents about the future of their children, so that the parents can go back and talk about the importance of education.

Ambedkar Knowledge center This center's are established at villages, mandal level, and district level by the SWAEROES team to propagate about the Ideals of Ambedkar's Philosophy. The focus of the center is to educate and create awareness about the importance of education. They share various successful case studies so that they are motivated and are encouraged to not only send their children for education but they also learn and understand the various growth opportunities available.

Mt. Everest All round development has always been the moto of the institution. Apart from education students have been divided based on their interest and talent. One such initiatives is Mountaineering and Adventure club, every year group of students have been setting standards and claiming various Mountains. This year Ms. Malavath Purna (A tribal girl) created a world record by becoming the youngest women to climb the Mount Everest and her team member Mr Sadhanapalli Anand Kumar became the First Dalit to climb on the Mt. Everest.

Pratigna Divas Previously November 23 is celebrated as Never give up day but from this year it is being celebrated as Pratigna Divas.

Vocational Training It prepare students for the every changing scenario, students are prepared in the various vocational training programs, so that students not only learn the theoretically but also practically.

Alumni Meets Alumni group is very big and they are spread across various sector and places. Alumni meets regularly happen at various levels starting from school level to zonal level to district level. They use this platform to create awareness about the latest trend in the market apart from latest opportunities in various fields.

References

External links
 https://3fd49816-a-62cb3a1a-s-sites.googlegroups.com/site/gosproceedings/TS%20Go%2021%20PRC%20RPS%202015%20Applicable%20to%20TSWREISSocial%20Welfare%20Residential%20Employees.PDF?attachauth=ANoY7cpB-QAeuIgouDXFqwzV4aBboDZ3zBwLHNsXFnd--Z70ecOuLTfQj6_SNTLlPpsHdD6ZI850unKVlFeF5s7-sdFz2lVzxoRt2IE6jhhRJhiGLn0A3HiUS5qGWeyWe6S0sRcc_qPgBmOYuXBHwSXYP6x1_FkhwsKn2J2nmym1vAaB2waUmC1OIBoPoCU3-vSlmfCRF3jMmQFhv1m5xbnVMf_IzG9g8gyX4RtQ2QKyoD0sU5G4uXj9ClGhJ7CtBTYtRVIk9fKQZTKK6mGnlF-PFk9MlSJFGCuLN4PyhAqJVCR6Eo-PmYBKKGlNL_jR-EVxZkmYqdTm&attredirects=0

Schools in Telangana
Government of Telangana
1984 establishments in Andhra Pradesh
Educational institutions established in 1984